Arthur M. Burroughs House is a historic home located at Conway in Horry County, South Carolina. It was built from 1903 to 1904 and is a two-story, asymmetrical plan frame residence sheathed in shiplap siding. It has a gabled-on-hip roof with two-story projecting pedimented bays. It features a two-story octagonal tower with turret, with bell-cast roof and a one-story hipped-roof porch in the Queen Anne style.

It was listed on the National Register of Historic Places in 1986.

References

Houses on the National Register of Historic Places in South Carolina
Queen Anne architecture in South Carolina
Houses completed in 1904
Houses in Horry County, South Carolina
National Register of Historic Places in Horry County, South Carolina
Buildings and structures in Conway, South Carolina